Kələntərli (also, Kalantarli, Kalantarly, and Kalentarly) is a village and municipality in the Barda Rayon of Azerbaijan.

Population 
It has a population of 1,757.

References 

Populated places in Barda District